Live At Dead Lake is the second album from English indie band Hot Club De Paris, which was released in mid-2008. The first single released from the album is entitled "Hey Housebrick" and was released on 16 June on Moshi Moshi records. There was a limited edition bonus disc included with the album.

Track listing

Disc 1
All Songs but Tracks 10 and 11 Written by Hot Club De Paris, unless where noted.

Call Me Mr. Demolition Ball
My Little Haunting
I Wasn't Being Heartless When I Said Your Favourite Song Lacked Heart
For Parties Past and Present
Let Go Of Everything
Friendship Song
Hey Housebrick
We Played Ourselves, Ain't Nobody Else's Fault
Boy Awaits Return Of The Runaway Girl
The Dice Just Wasn't Loaded From The Start (Davison, Rafferty)
The Anchor (Hurley, Watt)
This Thing Forever
Found Sleeping
Sparrow Flew With Swallows Wings

Bonus Disc
Hey! Housebrick (Acoustic Version)
My Little Haunting (Acoustic Version)
Boy Awaits Return Of The Runaway Girl (Acoustic Version)
For Parties Past And Present (Acoustic Version)
Straight To Hell (Acoustic Version) (The Clash cover)

Personnel

Hot Club de Paris
Paul Rafferty - Bass guitar, Baritone Guitar, Acoustic Guitar, Lead Vocals
Matthew Smith - Lead Guitar, Backing Vocals
Alasdair Smith - Drums, Percussion, Piano, Melodica, Backing Vocals

Additional personnel
Additional Vocals on 'Hey! Housebrick' by Lucy Johnson and Nicola Fitzsimmons
Bonus CD Tracks produced by Neil Strauch
Photography by Nick Brown, Rory Buckingham and Ali Moretti
Sleeve Art by Paul Rafferty

References

2008 albums
Hot Club de Paris albums
Moshi Moshi Records albums
Albums produced by Brian Deck